Xaqani (also, Xəqani) is a village and municipality in the Goygol Rayon of Azerbaijan. It has a population of 1,922.

References

Populated places in Goygol District